Poy Poy 2, known in Japan as , is a 1–4 multiplayer action game, developed by Konami for the PlayStation. It was released in 1998, and is the sequel to Poy Poy.

The gameplay is the same as in Poy Poy, though it features more powers and moves, as well as different characters and arenas. The characters use gloves, each with unique powers to aid gameplay. There are three game modes:

"PoyPoy Cup" is a single player campaign, where the player chooses a character and progresses through tournament stages, earning gold. They can use their winnings to purchase or upgrade gloves, as well as purchase 'drinks' which give the player a temporary upgrade for an event. Upon completing the championship multiple times, the player is given the opportunity to face the boss characters. Upgrading gloves requires the player to use that glove's particular ability a set number of times. Occasionally a dark figure will appear, offering to sell a special glove to the player.

"Party Play" is used for both Single and Multiplayer, where the up to four players (Using AI players to replace any missing slots) can set up a quick battle on whatever stage they choose.

"Team Battle" can only be played with one or two players. The player(s) are made into a two-person team (Using a replacement AI character if only one person is playing) and compete with other AI teams to score as many points as possible. They play seven matches, and when they are finished, a cash bonus is added to the "PoyPoy Cup" gold count.

The players are given points for direct hits (1 point each), collecting 'lucky' gold hearts (2 points each), and their finishing position based either on when they died, or their current health. First place gets 12 points, Second place gets 6, Third place gets 4 and Fourth place gets 2.

This is also one of the few PlayStation games that can't run on a PlayStation 2.

Characters/Gloves
 Harry  – Chase – Wave Arrow|           Health:170 Psycho Power:170 Speed:80
 Bubba – Magic – Vanisher|             Health:188 Psycho Power:180 Speed:68
 Joey – Hop – Escape|                  Health:145 Psycho Power:190 Speed:90
 Poison – Hail – Aurora|               Health:162 Psycho Power:160 Speed:76
 Arnold – Hurricane – Twister|         Health:219 Psycho Power:190 Speed:74
 Kage – Star – Star Force|             Health:185 Psycho Power:170 Speed:95
 Kool – Crush – Acid Rain|             Health:178 Psycho Power:220 Speed:74
 D.D – Teleporter – Flicker|           Health:199 Psycho Power:230 Speed:84
 Deco – Electro – Mind Zap|            Health:151 Psycho Power:180 Speed:90
 Ten Ten – Angel – Maid|               Health:167 Psycho Power:220 Speed:84
 Bull – Hammer – G.Hammer|             Health:200 Psycho Power:170 Speed:75
 Apache – Fire – Hellfire|             Health:185 Psycho Power:260 Speed:80
 Shane – Psychowhip – Psycho Lasso|    Health:193 Psycho Power:200 Speed:75
 Cutey – Ice – Omega Ice|              Health:160 Psycho Power:250 Speed:80
 Yamada – Storm – Shocker|             Health:235 Psycho Power:140 Speed:70
 Sanpey – Knife – Flash Wall|          Health:150 Psycho Power:300 Speed:65

Sanpey is unique in appearing as an ordinary AI contestant in-game, despite not starting as a playable character.

Other Gloves
Despite each character having recommended gloves to use, the player is free to choose whichever they like. These are additional options:

 Bomb – Super Bomb
 Seeker – Holy
 Shout – Quake
 Hunter – Falcon
 Poison – Crazy
 Thunder – Rainbow

As well as these standard gloves, there are also special gloves that cannot be used in "PoyPoy Cup" mode, and are unlocked in-game. These include:

 Armaggedon
 Shadow
 Dwarf Gas
 Dark Zone
 Giant
 Dwarf
 Trash
 Pandora
 Imitator
 Shuffle
 Ghost
 Joker
 Emperor/Meteor
 Hyperdwarf
 Maracas
 Lucky x2

Bosses
 Stage Killers
 Kali/Kally

Special conditions for boss fights
There are certain conditions which must be met in order to enter the "Stage Killers" and the "Kali Stage" stages, which includes:

 A minimum of 15 discs must be acquired 
 All discs acquired must be read or inspected
 All normal gloves must be owned
 All normal gloves must be upgraded
 All special gloves must be owned except for Emperor, Joker, Ghost and Pandora

Stages
 Grass
 Moai
 Ice
 Sand
 Park
 Shock
 Blast
 Warp
 Sky Cube
 Moon
 Channel Poy!Poy!*
 Stage Killers*
 Stage Kali*

Only accessible thru Poy!Poy! Cup when certain conditions are met.

1998 video games
Action video games
Konami games
PlayStation (console) games
PlayStation (console)-only games
Video game sequels
Multiplayer and single-player video games
Video games scored by Akira Yamaoka
Video games developed in Japan